Jindal Steel and Power Limited (JSPL) is an Indian steel company based in New Delhi. JSPL is a part of OP Jindal Group. 

In terms of tonnage, it is the third largest private steel producer in India and only private player in India to produce rails. The company manufactures and sells sponge iron, mild steel slabs, rails, mild steel, structural, hot rolled plates, iron ore pellets and coils. Jindal Steel and Power set up the world's first coal-gasification based DRI plant at Angul, Odisha that uses the locally available high-ash coal and turns it into synthesis gas for steel making, reducing the dependence on imported coke-rich coal. 
JSPL's coal gas-based steel tech became a case study at Harvard University.

Operations

Chhattisgarh

Raigarh
JSPL's Raigarh plant  is the world's largest coal-based sponge iron manufacturing facility in the world, with up to 3.6 million tonnes per annum (MTPA) steel production capacity. It has an installed 299 MW captive power plant (CPP) at Raigarh and a 540 MW CPP at Dongamauha, district Raigarh, Chhattisgarh.

Raipur (Machinery Division)
Equipped with in-house Design & Engineering and Quality Assurance facilities, JSPL's heavy machinery division in Raipur has expanded its manufacturing capacity & capabilities to meet the critical requirements of the industry. The division has ISO:9001:2015, ISO:14001:2015 & OHSAS18001:2007 & ISO 50001:2011 certification.

Odisha
Jindal Steel and Power operates India's Most Modern 6 MTPA Integrated Steel Plant at Angul – Odisha, consisting of a 4.25 MTPA Blast Furnace. The Integrated Steel Plant initially envisaged as the country's first steel plant to be based on purely locally available raw material, involved setting up the world's largest Coal Gasification Plant (CGP) for Steelmaking through the DRI (Direct Reduced Iron) route.

Angul
JSPL has a 6 MTPA integrated state-of-the-art steel plant at Angul, Odisha. It has a 1.2 MTPA plate mill, 1.5 MTPA Bar Mill and 810 MW captive power plant at Angul. Its plate mill is capable of producing 5-meter-wide plates, which is the widest plate ever built in India. The facility develops special grade plates for various critical applications like boilers, petroleum pipes, shipbuilding, automotive, oil exploration, earthmovers, warships, armoured vehicles and nuclear applications.

Recently Union steel minister Ram Chandra Prasad Singh inaugurated Jindal Steel's 1.4 MTPA TMT rebar mill at its integrated complex in Odisha's Angul district.

The plant's production capacity will soon be expanded from 6 MTPA to 25.2 MTPA making it the largest single-location steel plant capacity in the world as per an announcement made by Naveen Jindal.

Barbil
JSPL's pellet plant at Barbil has a total installed capacity of 9 MTPA  production for different pellet grades. The plant includes a dry grinding facility that harnesses the recuperation type of straight grate technology.

Jharkhand
Jindal Steel & Power has established a 1.6 MTPA capacity steel plant at Patratu, Jharkhand. The company plans to establish other industrial projects in this region as well.

Patratu
JSPL's manufacturing facility at Patratu, Jharkhand has a total finished steel capacity of 1.6 MTPA. The company operates a Wire Rod Mill (0.6 MTPA) and a Bar Rod Mill (1MTPA), along with a rebar service centre. These mills are equipped with the latest technology to offer high-quality products like TMT Rebars, Rounds, Angles, Wire Rods, and other ready-to-use products like Weld Mesh, Cut and Bend Rebars.

Listings and shareholding
The equity shares of JSPL are listed on the Bombay Stock Exchange and the National Stock Exchange of India.

Shareholding: On 31 March 2022, the promoter group Jindal Group held 60.5% of its equity shares. 27% of the shares were owned by the Institutional Investors. Public shareholders own approx. 12.5% of its shares.

Initiatives
Jindal Panther TMT RebarsJSPL has forayed into construction retail industry with the launch of Jindal Panther TMT Rebars for the housing segment. These rebars are manufactured in 1.0 MTPA capacity TMT Rebar mill at Patratu, Jharkhand, supplied by Siemens.

Jindal Institute of Power Technology (JIPT)JIPT was established to develop a pool of technically trained power plant professionals for power utilities of India and abroad. The course authorizes the pass outs to operate or undertake maintenance of any part or whole of a generating stations of capacity 100 MW & above together with the associated sub stations. It is recognized by Central Electricity Authority (CEA), Ministry of Power as Category-l Institute.

It is promoted by Jindal Education & Welfare Society, which is supported by Jindal Power Limited. The Institute possesses a simulator of 250 MW/600 MW generating units. JIPT is located in the 4X250, 4X600 MW Jindal Tamnar Thermal Power Plant in Tamnar, Raigarh, Chhattisgarh.

Controversies

Involvement in coalgate scamJindal Steel and Power was one of the two private companies to get a coal field in February 2009. JSPL got the Talcher coal field in Angul with reserves of 150 crore (1,500 million) metric tonnes after the cut-off date by the Central Government, while the Government-run Navratna Coal India Ltd was refused.

Both the blocks were in Odisha, with a combined worth of over ₹2 lakh crore and were meant for liquification of coal. The opposition parties alleged that the Government violated all norms to grant the coal fields. Naveen Jindal, however, denied any wrongdoing.

Iron ore reserve mining in BoliviaOn 3 June 2006, Bolivia granted development rights for one of the world's largest iron ore reserves in the El Mutún region to Jindal Steel. With an initial investment of US$1.5 billion, the company plans to invest an additional US$2.1 billion over the next eight years in the South American country.

Jindal Steel is likely to terminate the contract of investing $2.1 billion in setting up a steel plant in Bolivia, due to non-fulfilment of contractual obligations by the Bolivian Government.

References

External links
 

Steel companies of India
Electric power companies of India
Hisar (city)
Economy of West Bengal
Economy of Haryana
Companies based in New Delhi
Energy companies established in 1952
Manufacturing companies established in 1952
Energy in Haryana
Coal block allocation scam
Indian companies established in 1952
Companies listed on the National Stock Exchange of India
Companies listed on the Bombay Stock Exchange